A space heater is a device used to heat a single, small- to medium-sized area. This type of heater can be contrasted with central heating, which distributes heat to multiple areas.

Operation

Electric space heaters fall into four main categories: fan heaters, ceramic, infrared, and oil-filled.

 Fan heaters are the cheapest, but are often the least efficient and versatile. Nonetheless, they can be useful for heating small spaces, such as a small room or office cubicle. 
 Ceramic heaters push air across a piece of heated ceramic material. They can adequately heat a typical bedroom. 
 Infrared heaters provide more heat than ceramic models, and are also smaller and quieter. They do not oscillate like ceramic heaters, but consist of a heating chamber deep within the unit that prevent accidental fires, and allows for greater accumulation of heat before it is emitted by the unit. By the mid-2010s, many were outfitted with touch-screen controls and energy-saving settings, and were styled in such a way to complement the user's furniture. They grew in popularity in the 2010s. 
 Oil-filled heaters can silently heat larger rooms, but take longer to heat up. Like infrared models, they lack a fan, but circulate heat according to a room's air patterns, which is why it may take longer for a user to discern a difference in temperature. By the mid-2010s, some higher-end models included more precise controls.

Without a fan
In convective heaters without a fan, the heating element is surrounded by oil or water. These heaters warm a room more slowly, because the liquid must be heated before the heat can reach the surrounding air. They produce more heat after being turned off, however, because of the hot liquid inside the heater. The risk of fire (and burns) is sometimes less with oil-filled heaters than those with fans, but some fan-assisted heaters have a lower risk of fire (and burns) than other oil-filled heaters.

Radiant heaters

Halogen heaters have tungsten filaments in sealed quartz envelopes, mounted in front of a metal reflector in a plastic case. They operate at a higher temperature than nichrome-wire heaters but not as high as incandescent light bulbs, radiating primarily in the infrared spectrum. They convert up to 86 percent of their input power to radiant energy, losing the remainder to conductive and convective heat.

Safety
Fire, burns, and carbon monoxide poisoning are the main risks of space heaters. About 25,000 fires are caused by space heaters in the United States each year, resulting in about 300 deaths. Roughly 6,000 hospital emergency department visits annually in the US are caused by space heaters, mainly from burns.

Operation
Improper use can increase the risk of fire and burns. Safe operation includes:

Features
No one type of heater is safer than any other type. The risk of fire and burns can vary, depending on model and manufacturer.

Certifications
In the United States, Underwriters Laboratories' UL 1278 (for portable electric space heaters) and UL 1042 standards (for portable and fixed baseboard electric heaters) certify heater safety. Although the General Services Administration had Specification W-H-193 for electric space heaters, it was replaced in 1995 by the UL standards. Additional information on portable-heater safety may be found at the Department of Energy's Energy Efficiency website.

Efficiency
The U.S. Environmental Protection Agency has evaluated a number of space heaters, but none have received its Energy Star label.

See also
 Central heating
 District heating
 Electric heating
 Radiator
 Solar combisystem

References

External links 
 

Residential heating appliances